Lateral horn may refer to:
 Lateral horn of insect brain (an olfactory area)
 Lateral horn of spinal cord